Christy Zakarias (born 19 July 1998; 23 years old), also known as Christy Zee, is an Indonesian humanitarian public figure from Bekasi, Indonesia. She was the first Indonesian to receive the International Diana Memorial Award in 2013. Zakarias was awarded by former British Prime Minister David Cameron and British diplomat Mark Canning for co-founding and leading Riveria, a charity that teaches underprivileged Indonesian children English, when she was an eighth grader. 

Zakarias graduated from high school as a valedictorian from Sinarmas World Academy (SWA) in 2015. She then received a BSc with honours in Neuroscience from University College London (UCL) in 2018. Also a budding music producer, Zakarias has worked with artists such as Dua Lipa, Conor Maynard, and Cheat Codes in the past under the pen name "Zee" as a ghostwriter/songwriter for Universal Music Group Global.

Discography

Songwriting Credits 
 "Call Me Out" and "You Say" by Sarah Close
 "By Your Side" by Jonas Blue & RAYE
 "Genesis" by Dua Lipa
 "Streets of Gold" by Isaiah Firebrace
 "Thinking About You" by Alex Aiono
"Enemies" by Lauv

Mixing Credits 
 "Grenade" by G.O.A.T
 "This Is My Version" by Conor Maynard
 "Sober" by Cheat Codes & Nicky Romero

Arrangement Credits 
 "More" by The Citrus Clouds

References 

Indonesian women activists
Humanitarians
Living people
1998 births
21st-century Indonesian women musicians